Adolf Gärtner (24 July 1867 − 9 February 1937) was a German film director of the silent era.

Selected filmography
 The Night Talk (1917)
 Sadja (1918)
 The Lady in the Car (1919)
 Between Two Worlds (1919)
 Napoleon and the Little Washerwoman (1920)
 Mary Tudor (1920)
 Princess Woronzoff (1920)
 The Sons of Count Dossy (1920)
 The Voice (1920)
 The Devil and Circe (1921)
 The Last Witness (1921)
 The Adventuress of Monte Carlo (1921)
 The White Death (1921)
 The Riddle of the Sphinx (1921)
 The Circus Princess (1925)

References

Bibliography
 Tim Cresswell & Deborah Dixon. Engaging Film: Geographies of Mobility and Identity. Rowman & Littlefield Publishers, 2002.

External links

1867 births
1937 deaths
Film directors from Berlin
German emigrants to the United States